Keijo is a masculine Finnish given name. Notable people with the name include:

Keijo Huusko (born 1980), Finnish footballer
Keijo Kuusela (1921–1984), Finnish ice hockey player
Keijo Liinamaa (1929–1980), Finnish lawyer and politician
Keijo Parkkinen (born 1965), Finnish orienteer
Keijo Rosberg (born 1948), Finnish racing driver
Keijo Säilynoja (born 1970), Finnish ice hockey player
Keijo Vanhala (1940–2003), Finnish modern pentathlete
Keijo Virtanen (born 1945), Finnish historian

Finnish masculine given names